Plœuc-sur-Lié is a former commune in the Côtes-d'Armor department in Brittany in northwestern France. On 1 January 2016, it was merged into the new commune Plœuc-l'Hermitage.

Geography

Climate
Plœuc-sur-Lié has a oceanic climate (Köppen climate classification Cfb).

Population

Inhabitants of Plœuc-sur-Lié are called plœucois in French.

History
The oldest antiquity may be the menhir of Bayo.  In 1643, as a reward for services rendered at the siege of La Rochelle (1627-1628), King Louis XIV granted Sebastian de Ploeuc the right to hold four fairs a year and also a weekly market. In 1664, the de Ploeuc family sold its lands to the La Rivières, whose coat of arms can still be seen on the Moulien de la Corbière. The Count de La Rivière was the ancestor of Lafayette, who sold his estates at Ploeuc to cover the expenses which fell on him as a result of the American War of Independence. This war also caused great harm to the local linen industry.

Today, Plœuc-sur-Lié retains its rural character, with a prosperous agriculture which is largely from potato growing. Apart from the Bayo menhir, there are many restored old houses, windmills, and nearby forests.

See also
Communes of the Côtes-d'Armor department

References

External links

ploeucsurlie.fr Official site

Former communes of Côtes-d'Armor